Narivaran may refer to:
 Narivaran-e Gharbi
 Narivaran-e Sharqi